Nat Perrin (March 15, 1905 – May 9, 1998) was an American comedy film, television, and radio screenwriter, producer, and director, who contributed gags and storylines to several Marx Brothers films and co-wrote the script for the film Hellzapoppin' (1941) adapted from the stage musical. He is credited with writing the screenplay or story outline for over 25 films, including The Big Store (1941), The Great Morgan (1945), and Song of the Thin Man (1947), as well as several television series.

Biography
Perrin was a registered attorney who never practiced; he instead worked in the publicity department for Warner Bros.  in 1930. He often told the story of how he made his way into Groucho Marx's dressing room in 1931 with a forged letter of introduction from Moss Hart. Groucho  was impressed with Perrin, and arranged for him to be hired by Paramount Pictures for the film Monkey Business (1931). The two went on to become lifelong friends. In the late 1930s, Perrin produced for Columbia Pictures, moving to Metro-Goldwyn-Mayer in the 1940s.  
 
In the early 1950s, he became a producer for such TV shows as The Red Skelton Show (run 1951–1971) and the anthology series Death Valley Days (run 1952–1970). He produced and was head writer for The Addams Family series from 1964–1966.

Beginning in the late 1970s and well into his later years, Perrin taught screenwriting and film history at California State University Northridge.

His lifelong friendship with Groucho Marx, for whom he also wrote the Flywheel, Shyster, and Flywheel radio shows, came to a close when Perrin served as temporary conservator of the comedian's estate in 1977.

External links

1905 births
1998 deaths
American comedy writers
American male television writers
American male screenwriters
Screenwriting instructors
Writers from New York (state)
20th-century American comedians
20th-century American screenwriters